The Three Burials of Melquiades Estrada (also known as Three Burials) is a 2005 neo-Western film directed by and starring Tommy Lee Jones and written by Guillermo Arriaga. It also stars Barry Pepper, Julio Cedillo, Dwight Yoakam, and January Jones.

The film was inspired by the real-life killing in Texas of a teenager, Esequiel Hernandez Jr, by United States Marines during a military operation near the United States–Mexico border as well as the novel As I Lay Dying by William Faulkner, which contains the same plot premise and challenges encountered in the film.

The film has many flashbacks and sometimes the same event is shown from different perspectives.

Plot
Melquiades Estrada, a Mexican undocumented worker working in Texas as a cowboy, shoots at a coyote which is menacing his small flock of goats. A nearby United States Border Patrol officer, Norton, thinks he is being attacked and shoots back, killing Melquiades. Norton quickly buries Melquiades and does not report anything. Melquiades' body is found and is reburied in a local cemetery by the sheriff's office. Evidence that he may have been killed by Border Patrol is ignored by the local sheriff, Belmont, who would prefer to avoid trouble with the Border Patrol.

Pete Perkins, a rancher and Melquiades' best friend, finds out from a waitress, Rachel, that the killer was Norton. Perkins kidnaps Norton after tying up his wife, Lou Ann, and forces him to dig up Melquiades' body. Perkins had promised Melquiades that he would bury him in his home town of Jiménez, if he died in Texas. Perkins undertakes a journey on horseback into Mexico with the body tied to a mule and his captive Norton in tow. It is clear to Sheriff Belmont that Perkins has kidnapped Norton, and so police officers and the Border Patrol begin to search for them. Belmont sees them heading towards the Mexico border, but as he takes aim at Perkins, he can't bring himself to shoot and returns to town, leaving the pursuit to Border Patrol.

On their way across the harsh countryside, the pair experience a series of surrealistic encounters. They spend an afternoon with an elderly blind American, who listens to Mexican radio for company. The man asks to be shot since there is no one left to take care of him. He does not want to commit suicide because, he argues, doing so would offend God. Perkins refuses as it would offend God. Norton attempts to escape and is bitten by a rattlesnake and eventually discovered by a group of illegal immigrants crossing into Texas. Perkins gives one of them a horse as barter payment for guiding them across the river to an herbal healer. She turns out to be a woman whose nose Norton had broken when he recently punched her in the face during an arrest. At Perkins's request, she saves Norton's life before exacting her revenge by breaking Norton's nose with a coffee pot.

The captivity, the tiring journey, and the rotting corpse slowly take a profound psychological toll on Norton. At one point the duo encounter a group of Mexican cowboys watching American soap operas on a television hooked up to their pickup truck. The program is the same episode that was airing when Norton had sex with his wife in their trailer earlier in the movie. Norton is visibly shaken and is given half a bottle of liquor by one of the cowboys. Norton's wife is shown as she decides to leave the border town to return to her home town of Cincinnati. She has grown distant from her husband and seems unconcerned about his kidnapping, stating that he is "beyond redemption".

Perkins and Norton arrive at a town that is supposed to be near Jiménez, but no one in the town has heard of Jiménez. Perkins has some luck in locating a woman Melquiades indicated was his wife but, when Perkins confronts her, she states that she has never heard of Melquiades Estrada and lives in town with her husband and children. She does visibly react to a photograph Perkins shows her of Melquiades standing behind her and her children, stating that she does "...not want to get in trouble with her husband". Perkins continues onward searching for Melquiades' descriptions of a place "filled with beauty". Eventually they come upon a ruined house which Perkins feels was the one Melquiades had mentioned. Perkins and Norton repair the walls, construct a new roof and bury Melquiades for the third and final time.

Perkins then demands that Norton beg forgiveness for the killing, but Norton responds with obstinacy. Perkins fires several shots from his pistol around Norton until he complies, asking for forgiveness from Melquiades. Perkins accepts his hysterical grief and in passing calls him "son". Leaving Norton the second horse, Perkins rides away as Norton calls out and asks him if he will be okay.

The film's plot is very similar in some ways to Peckinpah's Bring Me the Head of Alfredo Garcia (1974) as both movies include the transportation of a corpse in Mexico and the gradual development of a relationship between the body and its transporter, and in both films the transporter and the deceased had a relationship with the same woman.

Cast

 Tommy Lee Jones as Pete Perkins
 Barry Pepper as Ptmn. Mike Norton
 Julio Cedillo as Melquiades Estrada
 Dwight Yoakam as Sheriff Belmont
 January Jones as Lou Ann Norton
 Melissa Leo as Rachel
 Richard Andrew Jones as Bob 
 Vanessa Bauche as Mariana
 Levon Helm as Old Man with Radio
 Mel Rodriguez as Captain Gómez
 Cecilia Suárez as Rosa
 Ignacio Guadalupe as Lucio

Production
The film was an international co-production film between France, the United States and Mexico. Filming locations in Texas included Big Bend National Park, Big Bend Ranch State Park, Lajitas, Midland, Monahans, Odessa, Van Horn, and Redford.

Reception
The film received generally positive reviews; it currently holds an 85% rating at Rotten Tomatoes, where the consensus states: "Tommy Lee Jones' directorial debut is both a potent western and a powerful morality tale."

Awards and nominations
Cannes Film Festival

 Win: Best Actor – Tommy Lee Jones
 Win: Best Screenplay – Guillermo Arriaga
 Nominated: Golden Palm – Tommy Lee Jones

Belgian Syndicate of Cinema Critics
 Nominated: Grand Prix

Independent Spirit Awards
 Nominated: Best Film
 Nominated: Best Supporting Male- Barry Pepper
 Nominated: Best Screenplay- Guillermo Arriaga
 Nominated: Best Cinematography- Chris Menges

References

External links
 
 
 
 
 
 The Three Burials of Melquiades Estrada at The Numbers
 "At the Border: the Limits of Knowledge in The Three Burials of Melquiades Estrada and No Country for Old Men" Movie: A Journal of Film Criticism, No.1, 2010

2005 films
2005 Western (genre) films
2005 independent films
Sony Pictures Classics films
2005 directorial debut films
American Western (genre) films
American nonlinear narrative films
English-language French films
EuropaCorp films
Films directed by Tommy Lee Jones
Films produced by Luc Besson
Films scored by Marco Beltrami
Films set in Texas
Films shot in Mexico
Films shot in Texas
Films with screenplays by Guillermo Arriaga
French Western (genre) films
French nonlinear narrative films
Mexican Western (genre) films
Neo-Western films
2000s Spanish-language films
2000s American films
2000s French films
2000s Mexican films